Captain general of the Navy is the highest naval officer rank of the Spanish Navy, rated OF-10 with the NATO ranking system. The routine honorary appointments formally ceased in 1999. The rank of captain general of the Navy is equivalent to an admiral of the fleet in many nations, a captain general of the Spanish Army or an Captain general of the Air Force in the Spanish Air and Space Force.

A peculiar usage of the term captain general arose in the Spanish Navy of the 16th century. A captain general was appointed by the king as the leader of a fleet (although the term 'squadron' is more appropriate, as most galleon fleets rarely consisted of more than a dozen vessels, not counting escorted merchantmen), with full jurisdictional powers. The fleet second-in-command was the admiral, an officer appointed by the capitan-general and responsible for the seaworthiness of the squadron.

Since King Amadeo's reign (1871–1873), the monarchs used captain general of the Navy rank and insignia as Commander-in-chief. Briefly abolished by the Second Spanish Republic, it was restored in 1938 during the regime of Francisco Franco, a General of the Army. Since 19th century honorary promotions of retired admirals to this rank were also made, such as the prime ministers Juan Bautista Aznar-Cabañas (1928) and Luis Carrero Blanco (1973), the only posthumous promotion. Infante Juan, Count of Barcelona, claimant to the Spanish throne (1941–1977) and father of King Juan Carlos, was also made honorary captain general of the Spanish Navy in 1992.

List

See also 
 Captain general
 Captain general of the Army
 Captain general of the Air Force
 Spanish Navy

Notes

References 

Juan y Ferragut, Mariano. La Marina en 1808, Cuadernos monográficos del IHCN. Spanish Navy (In Spanish).

 
Capitanes generales